Market Street Historic District is a national historic district located at Palmyra in Wayne County, New York.  The district consists of a set of commercial and residential structures built between the 1830s and 1880s.  Some of the commercial buildings have cast iron storefronts.

It was listed on the National Register of Historic Places in 1972.  In 2009, it was included in the Palmyra Village Historic District.

References

Historic districts on the National Register of Historic Places in New York (state)
Historic districts in Wayne County, New York
National Register of Historic Places in Wayne County, New York